Lutton may refer to the following places in England:
 Lutton, Cornwood, village in Cornwood parish, Devon
 Lutton, South Brent, hamlet in South Brent parish, Devon
 Lutton, Lincolnshire, village and civil parish
 Lutton, Northamptonshire, village and civil parish
 East Lutton and West Lutton in North Yorkshire, collectively known as 'Luttons Ambo' (not to be confused with the nearby Huttons Ambo)

See also
 Luton (disambiguation)